The 1950 season was the thirty-ninth season for Santos FC.

References

External links
Official Site 

Santos
1950
1950 in Brazilian football